= Colla Jean McDonald =

Colla Jean MacDonald is a Professor Emeritus and Distinguished Professor at the University of Ottawa. Her research focuses on curriculum design, evaluation and eLearning. Dr. MacDonald took early retirement from the University of Ottawa after 29 years and is currently working as a Senior Research Advisor in the Vice Rectors Office at the University of Malta.
